Fusuconcharium is a genus of lobopodian known only from its biomineralized dorsal plates, which somewhat resemble those of Microdictyon.

References

Xenusia
Prehistoric protostome genera